Melloconcha rosacea, also known as the tiny rosy glass-snail, is a species of land snail that is endemic to Australia's Lord Howe Island in the Tasman Sea.

Description
The discoidal shell of the mature snail is 1.8–2.1 mm in height, with a diameter of 3.7–4.1 mm, and a flat or slightly raised spire. It is smooth, glossy and dark amber-brown in colour in live animals, the empty shell being golden-brown. The whorls are rounded, with flat sutures and finely incised spiral grooves. It has an ovately lunate aperture and closed umbilicus. The animal is dark grey with darker eyestalks.

Distribution and habitat
The snail has a patchy distribution across the island and is found in leaf litter and the axils of palms.

References

 
 

 
rosacea
Gastropods of Lord Howe Island
Taxa named by Tom Iredale
Gastropods described in 1944